Dawn Faith Mackay  (née Mlotshwa, born 16 January 1982 in KwaMashu, KwaZulu-Natal, South Africa) is an author, musician, speaker, social activist and the host of her own TV show titled Deep & Meaningful. She started her music career in 2008 working with a local artists in South Africa and has since released her debut EP in 2015 titled "Audience of One". In 2016, she established a TV production company, MYZIZI Productions, named after her daughter Zinhle (Zizi) Grace, who was born around four months premature and died aged three months. in Melbourne, Australia.

Early life 
Mackay's love of singing started in her grandmother's church, which was located in the South African township of KwaMashu, where Mackay herself grew up. This love was nurtured by her mother, who would blast records by Aretha Franklin, Donnie Hathaway and Kool & The Gang early in the morning and late at night. At a young age, Mackay also experienced the power of music in creating social change, as it formed the soundtrack for the anti-apartheid movement.

Social activism 
Influenced by her upbringing and a deep desire to make a difference, Mackay has dedicated much of her life to inspiring young people to rise above their circumstances. She was the South African Director of one of the world's largest youth-run organisation, Oaktree (foundation) and worked in partnership with Nelson Mandela's 46664 to find ways of using music for good. After relocating to Australia in 2009, she expanded her pursuit of justice, working to empower disadvantaged youth and recent immigrants.

Music 
Mackay has recorded and collaborated with several high-profile artists in both South Africa (Loyiso Bala, Zakes Bantwini & Ntokozo Mbambo) and Australia (Evermore, Diafrix). Having embraced her innate talent as a singer and songwriter, Mackay is now using her own music to reach and inspire people around the world. She is regularly asked to perform both acoustic and with a full band at all manner of events – weddings, parties, concerts, and award shows. She has done so in some of the world's most revered venues such as the Sydney Opera House, and alongside legendary artists like Yvonne Chaka Chaka.

Her first single, "Messed Up Heart", was produced by Jason Heerah (Electric Empire) and Dorian West (X Factor, Australia's Got Talent) – and helped make Mackay the No. 1 artist in Melbourne and No. 7 in Australia on the ReverbNation R&B/Soul charts. It was followed by her highly anticipated debut EP, "Audience of One", which was written and produced by Mackay herself. In a departure from the sounds that often dominate Christian music, the EP is a collection of songs that defies classification but defines 'soul' – seamlessly integrating elements of jazz and gospel, with lyrics that are both confronting and uplifting. It was inspired by the death of her daughter, the birth of her son, and the journey between these two life-changing events.

Discography

Speaking 
She's also been called on to share her story as a motivational and keynote speaker at conferences, churches and schools, including Oprah Winfrey's Leadership Academy for Girls.

Recent work 
Mackay returned to South Africa in 2016 to write and release her first book, Dear God, which tells the story of her daughter's death and how Mackay found her way back to life and hope. Her next major project is a talk show, called Deep & Meaningful, of which she is the creator and executive producer. The show will be hosted by Mackat, will feature a range of high-profile women as guests, and will air across Africa and the world on BET Africa Channel 129.

She currently lives in Johannesburg with her Australian husband Nic Mackay and their son, Lwandle Mackay.

References

External links 
 Official website

South African writers
South African women writers
South African musicians
South African activists
South African women activists
South African television personalities
1982 births
Living people